Marantu (also Romanized as Mārāntū) is a village in Cham Chamal Rural District, Bisotun District, Harsin County, Kermanshah Province, Iran. In a 2006 census, its population was reported to be 49.

References 

Populated places in Harsin County